X-Fire (pronounced 'Cross-fire'), was a paintball-based TV gameshow, aired on Channel 4 in the UK and presented by Ed Hall.

Synopsis
The programme was a game show, featuring a strike team consisting of 6 players armed with paintball markers (known as "emulsifiers"), who attempt to complete challenges in simulated Special Forces-type raids against similarly-armed opponents. In general, the contestants play games of paintball against the show's antagonists in elaborately constructed scenarios.

The teams would be opposed by a host of "grunts", armed with slow-firing weapons and the "Special Forces"; six individuals (with made-up character names and bios) armed with the same weapons as the contestants. These Special Forces were named Hellmet (named Helmet Strebi) (ranked Oberleutnant), Morgan (Morgan Johnson) (ranked Sergeant), Clawz (Vanessa Upton) (Private), Dalia (Dalia Mikneviciute) (Sergeant), AJ (Andrew J Dickens) (Commander) and Little Yin (Anna Luong) (Private). "Grunts" would typically be dispatched quickly, whereas the Special Forces would take strong defensive positions and present serious challenges to the team.

A shot in the head or torso was considered an "emulsification" and the shot party would play dead.

Teams were inserted and extracted from the missions by a Ford Transit Van. Missions included hazards such as mines and laser tripwires, and puzzles which the teams would need to solve. Missions were also required to be completed within a time limit. The games would take place in simulated military compounds, office buildings, or bunker complexes which were constructed at the facilities of the decommissioned RAF Bentwaters.

Each programme would contain three missions, the last of which always took place in the 'Special Forces HQ'. The missions for each episode would be based around a particular narrative, such as stopping toxic waste dumping or preventing the production of counterfeit bank notes. The Special Forces would always be involved with these evil plots, and thus had to be stopped by the strike team. For the final mission, the captain of the Strike Team would set the difficulty level: Easy, Standard or Extreme. Easy difficulty meant the team would face 4 members of the Special Forces and all credit awards were halved, Standard difficulty meant the team would face 5 members of the Special Forces and all credit awards were as normal, and Extreme difficulty meant the team would face all 6 members of the Special Forces and all credit awards were doubled.

The teams' actions in the challenges were rewarded with credits. In between each challenge the teams could purchase items such as more paintballs, shields, paint grenades, a stationary shotgun weapon (firing up to 100 shots in one go) or buy back teammates who had been "emulsified" in the previous challenge. The teams' final credits totals were used to determine their positions on the series leaderboard.

The series was axed in 2002. The penultimate episode, titled 'Star Wars', was never broadcast. Instead Channel 4 broadcast the final episode to end the series.

Episodes

External links

Channel 4 original programming
2000s British game shows
2001 British television series debuts
2002 British television series endings
English-language television shows
Paintball-related media